A Caucasian dhol is a kind of dhol drum in the Caucasus. This drum has traditionally been used by various Caucasian warriors in battles, and today is used in national folk music.

Construction 

Сaucasian dhol is a double-sided barrel drum, the shell made from wood or acrylic plastic, and the heads from thin leather or synthetic plastic film. The traditional preference is a walnut wood shell and goat skin heads. The skin or plastic film should be spanned on strong iron round rod, strong during the tuning up of the drum heads the rod should not be bent, the round rod is optimal for touch hands. Adjustment made by hemp or synthetic rope.

Playing 
The Сaucasian dhol is mostly played as an accompanying instrument with Garmon, Zurna and Clarinet. There are two playing variants, one with hands and the second with two wooden sticks. Usually the sticks are made of dogwood as a heavy type of wood is preferred.

Regional forms and traditions

Armenia 
In Armenia, the drum is called Dhol, and is made from natural thin leather skins or plastic film heads. The shell is wooden or acrylic plastic. The Armenian dhol is traditionally played with hands only, but on several occasions, sticks have been used.

Chechnya and Ingushetia 
In Chechnya and Ingushetia it's called Fuott or Wuott, and as many traditional drums, it is made from cylindrical wooden shell and acoustic membrane from natural leather skin, traditionally played with the bare hands.

Georgia  
In Georgia it is called Dholi or Doli, their dhols almost used from natural thick leather skin heads and wooden shell. The playing is almost entirely done with hands, similar to Armenia.

Southern Russia 
In Southern Russia it is called Doul, and are almost identical with the Armenian ones.

Musical instruments
Hand drums